Purchart is a Germanic masculine given name and a variant of Burchard. Notable people with the name include:

 Purchart I (920/930–975), abbot of Saint Gall
 Purchart II (died 1022), abbot of Saint Gall

Germanic masculine given names